The Prešeren Lodge at Stol is a mountain hut on the southern side of Mt. Stol in the Karawanks (northwestern Slovenia), just below the peak of Little Stol. It is named after the Slovenian poet France Prešeren. The first hut was built in 1909. During World War II, it was burnt down; it was rebuilt in 1966.

Starting points 
 4 h: from the Pristava Lodge in Javorniški Rovt, over the Seča Pass
 2.5 h: from the Valvasor Lodge below Stol, via the Slovenian Mountain Hiking Trail
 3 h: from the Valvasor Lodge below Stol, passing the Zabrezje Pasture (

Nearby lodges 
 2 h: Klagenfurt Lodge, across the Belščica Pass
 3.5 h: Zelenica Lodge

Mountains 
 0.25 h: Stol

See also 
 Slovenian Mountain Hiking Trail

External links 
 Routes, Photos & Dexcription
 www.pzs.si

Mountain huts in Slovenia
Karawanks
France Prešeren